Oud-Zuid (English: Old South) is the name of a neighbourhood and of a (larger) former borough (stadsdeel) of Amsterdam.

History
The borough was formed in 1998 by merging the former boroughs of Amsterdam-Zuid and De Pijp, lying southwest and south of the centre of Amsterdam. In 2010, the borough was merged with Zuideramstel to form the borough Amsterdam-Zuid. On 1 January 2005 the borough had a population of 83,696. It included some of the richest neighbourhoods in Amsterdam, most of which were developed at the end of the 19th century.

Neighbourhoods
The following neighbourhoods were included in the borough Oud-Zuid:

From the former borough of De Pijp:
Oude Pijp
Nieuwe Pijp including the Diamantbuurt

From the former borough Amsterdam-Zuid (as it existed from 1990 to 1998):
Apollobuurt
Hoofddorppleinbuurt
Museum Quarter 
Duivelseiland
Schinkelbuurt
Stadionbuurt
Willemspark
Vondelpark (park)

The area Prinses Irenebuurt, which was part of the former borough of Amsterdam-Zuid, was not included in Oud-Zuid, but added to the borough Zuideramstel which was also created in 1998.

Before 1990 in popular usage amongst Amsterdammers, "Oud-Zuid" referred to a much smaller area: the Museumkwartier (incl. Duivelseiland) and the Willemspark area. The City of Amsterdam used the term "Oud-Zuid" to refer to a larger area which also included De Pijp and the Schinkelbuurt.

Destinations
Popular tourist and cultural destinations are located in the borough of Oud-Zuid, including:
 the Albert Cuyp Market, which is held on the Albert Cuypstraat
 the Vondelpark: a  park containing an open-air theatre and until April 4, 2012 the museum of the EYE Film Institute
 the Stedelijk Museum and Van Gogh Museum, as well as the Rijksmuseum Amsterdam are located on the Museumplein ('Museum Square')
 the Heineken Experience located in the former Heineken brewery
 the Concertgebouw, a concert hall located on the Museumplein

References

Neighbourhoods of Amsterdam
Former boroughs of Amsterdam
 2